Yanet Ursula Sovero Niño (born May 2, 1983) is a Peruvian freestyle wrestler. She competed in the women's freestyle 58 kg event at the 2016 Summer Olympics, in which she was eliminated in the round of 16 by Jackeline Rentería.

She won the silver medal in her event at the 2022 Bolivarian Games held in Valledupar, Colombia. She won the bronze medal in her event at the 2022 South American Games held in Asunción, Paraguay.

References

External links
 

1983 births
Living people
Peruvian female sport wrestlers
Olympic wrestlers of Peru
Wrestlers at the 2016 Summer Olympics
Pan American Games medalists in wrestling
Pan American Games bronze medalists for Peru
Wrestlers at the 2015 Pan American Games
South American Games gold medalists for Peru
South American Games bronze medalists for Peru
South American Games medalists in wrestling
Competitors at the 2018 South American Games
Competitors at the 2022 South American Games
Medalists at the 2015 Pan American Games
Pan American Wrestling Championships medalists
20th-century Peruvian women
21st-century Peruvian women